Dorion can mean:

Places
In Greece:
Dorion (Greece), a town of ancient Messenia 
In Canada:
Vaudreuil-Dorion
Laurier-Dorion, a current Quebec provincial electoral district in Montreal
Dorion, a former Quebec provincial electoral district
Montréal-Dorion, a former Quebec provincial electoral district in Montreal
Dorion, Ontario, a township in northwestern Ontario
Dorion Township, renamed in 1988 to Cayamant, Quebec
 Dorion-Rigaud line, a commuter rail line operated in the Greater Montreal, Quebec, Canada now known as Vaudreuil-Hudson

Persons
 Antoine-Aimé Dorion (January 17, 1818 – May 31, 1891), a French Canadian politician and jurist
 Dan Dorion (born March 2, 1963), a retired American ice hockey player
 Éric Dorion (born June 24, 1970), a politician from Quebec, Canada
 Jacques Dorion (ca 1797 – December 29, 1877), a doctor and political figure in Lower Canada
 Jean Dorion, a Canadian sociologist and a Quebec nationalist leader
 Jean-Baptiste-Éric Dorion (September 17, 1826 – November 1, 1866), a journalist and political figure in Canada East
 Marie Aioe Dorion (c.1786 – September 5, 1850), only female member of the Astor Expedition
 Noël Dorion (July 24, 1904 - March 9, 1980), a law professor, lawyer and Canadian politician
 Pierre-Antoine Dorion (ca 1789 – September 12, 1850), a businessman and political figure in Lower Canada
 Pierre-Nérée Dorion (October 16, 1816 – ?), a Quebec land surveyor and political figure
 Roberto Dorion

Given name 

 Dorion Sagan (born 1959), an American science writer and son of Carl Sagan